The 1969 Magyar Kupa (English: Hungarian Cup) was the 30th season of Hungary's annual knock-out cup football competition.

Final

See also
 1969 Nemzeti Bajnokság I

References

External links
 Official site 
 soccerway.com

1969–70 in Hungarian football
1969–70 domestic association football cups
1969